Jacques Francis Albert Pierre Miller AC FRS FAA (born 2 April 1931) is a French-Australian research scientist. He is known for having discovered the function of the thymus and for the identification, in mammalian species of the two major subsets of lymphocytes (T cells and B cells) and their function.

Early life and education
Miller was born on 2 April 1931 in Nice, France, as J.F.A.P. Meunier, and grew up in France, Switzerland and China, mostly in Shanghai. After the outbreak of World War II, in anticipation of Japan's entry into the war, his family moved in 1941 to Sydney, Australia, and changed their last name to "Miller". He was educated at St Aloysius' College in Sydney, where he met his future colleague, Sir Gustav Nossal.

Miller studied medicine at the University of Sydney, and had his first experience of laboratory research in the laboratory of Professor Patrick de Burgh where he studied virus infection.

Career
In 1958, Miller travelled to the United Kingdom on a Gaggin Research Fellowship from the University of Queensland. He was accepted to the Chester Beatty Research Institute of Cancer Research (part of the Institute of Cancer Research, London) and as a PhD student at the University of London. Miller chose to study the pathogenesis of lymphocytic leukemia in mice, expanding on the research of Ludwik Gross into murine leukemia virus. Miller showed that experimental animals without a thymus at birth were incapable of rejecting foreign tissues and resisting many infections, thus demonstrating that the thymus is vital for development and function of the adaptive immune system. Prior to this, the thymus was believed to be a vestigial organ with no function. His discovery has led many to describe Miller as the "world's only living person who can claim to have been the first to have described the functions of a human organ". In 1963, Miller continued his work into the function of the thymus at the National Institutes of Health.

In 1966, Miller returned to Australia to become a research group leader at the Walter and Eliza Hall Institute of Medical Research in Melbourne, at the invitation of its new director Sir Gustav Nossal, the successor of Sir Macfarlane Burnet. There, with student Graham Mitchell, he discovered that mammalian lymphocytes can be separated into what were later called T cells and B cells, and that these interact to allow normal antibody production (T cell help). Miller went on to show that the thymus produces the T cells, that it removes autoreactive T cells (central T cell tolerance) and several other landmark findings in immunology. These are considered crucial to understanding diseases such as cancer, autoimmunity and AIDS, as well as processes such as transplant rejection, allergy and antiviral immunity. Miller was also the first to provide evidence that thymus-derived immune cells are important for the defense against certain tumors, which forms the basis for modern cancer immunotherapy.

Semi-retired since 1996, Miller is still involved in immunological research.

Miller has had a longstanding interest in art, and studied art in the 1980s. His art has been exhibited at venues in Melbourne.

Awards and honours
1966 Gairdner Foundation International Award
1967 Scientific Medal of the Zoological Society of London
1970 Elected a Fellow of the Royal Society, London
1971 Macfarlane Burnet Medal and Lecture of the Australian Academy of Science
1974 Paul Ehrlich and Ludwig Darmstaedter Prize
1978 Rabbi Shai Shacknai Memorial Prize
1981 Officer of the Order of Australia (AO)
1982 Elected Foreign Associate for the United States National Academy of Science
1983 International St Vincent Prize; World Health Organization
1990 Sandoz Prize for Immunology
1990 Peter Medawar Prize for the Transplantation Society
1992 Croonian Prize, Royal Society
1995 J. Allyn Taylor International Prize in Medicine
2000 Florey Medal
2001 Royal Society of London Copley Medal
2001 Centenary Medal
2003 Prime Minister's Prize for Science
2003 Appointed a Companion of the Order of Australia (AC)
2015 ANZAAS Medal
2018 Japan Prize for Medicine and Medicinal Science
2019 Albert Lasker Award for Basic Medical Research

See also
 French Australians

References

External links

Seminal publications

1931 births
Living people
Companions of the Order of Australia
Fellows of the Australian Academy of Science
Fellows of the Royal Society
French emigrants to Australia
Foreign associates of the National Academy of Sciences
Recipients of the Albert Lasker Award for Basic Medical Research
Recipients of the Copley Medal
Sydney Medical School alumni
WEHI alumni
People educated at St Aloysius' College (Sydney)
Academics of the Institute of Cancer Research